Phattepur  is a village development committee in Saptari District in the Sagarmatha Zone of south-eastern Nepal. At the time of the 2011 Nepal census it had a population of 11303 people(5268 male and 6035 female) living in 2524 individual households. The Phattepur village development committee is now a part of Saptakoshi Municipality. The Saptakoshi Municipality is located in  the Madhesh Province.

References

Populated places in Saptari District
VDCs in Saptari District